Goat Range Provincial Park is a provincial park in British Columbia, Canada.

The park was established to protect unique species such as the (protected) Gerrard Rainbow Trout (the largest in the world-up to 50 lb) and the distinct color group of "White Grizzly" for which some hoped the park would be named. There are no facilities in this wilderness park, other than rudimentary trails and backcountry campsites. The park is 879.47 km2 in size, is located between Slocan Lake (S) and Trout Lake (N), bordering Kootenay Lake  The regions surrounding the park are known for its mining ghost towns from the days of the "Silvery Slocan" silver and galena rush to its south and also in the Lardeau country around Trout Lake and the north end of the Arrow Lakes.

References

Provincial parks of British Columbia
West Kootenay
Slocan Valley
1995 establishments in British Columbia
Protected areas established in 1995